Governor Hedges may refer to:

John Hedges (British governor) (fl. 1760s), Acting Governor of British East Florida in 1763
William Hedges (colonial administrator) (1632–1701), Governor of Bengal Agency from 1681 to 1684